Raisonnable was a 64-gun ship of the line of the French Navy, launched in 1755.

Commissioned into the Royal Navy in 1759 under Captain John Montagu, she served in the Leeward Islands until 3 February 1762 when she grounded and was wrecked on a reef off the port of Martinique.

See also
List of ships captured in the 18th century

Notes

References
 

Raisonnable (1755)
Ships of the line of the Royal Navy
1755 ships
Captured ships
Shipwrecks in the Caribbean Sea